W. T. Jones was an American politician who was a member of the National Union Party. On November 7, 1866, he was elected representative of Nye County in the Nevada Assembly alongside James M. Groves. Jones' term started the next day. He served in one regular and one special session and his mandate ended after the next election, that was held in November 1868. Jones and Groves were succeeded by William Doolin and John Bowman.

References 

Nevada Unionists
Members of the Nevada Assembly
People from Nye County, Nevada
19th-century American politicians